Robert Grey may refer to:

Robert Grey (musician) (born 1951, also known as Robert Gotobed), drummer for Wire
Robert D. Grey, American academic administrator
Robert Henry Grey (1891–1934), American silent film actor 
Robert J. Grey Jr., American lawyer
Robert T. Grey, American diplomat

See also
Robert Grey Bushong (1883–1951), U.S. Representative from Pennsylvania
Robert Gray (disambiguation)